Schlag den Raab (German for Beat (the) Raab) was a live game show that was televised by German television channel ProSieben on Saturday evenings from September 2006 until December 2015. A total of six episodes were produced and broadcast each year and featured one contestant competing with media personality Stefan Raab in a number of disciplines for a variable amount of money.

Concept 
At the beginning of an episode five possible candidates (usually four men and one woman) were introduced to the audience. Each candidate presented him- or herself in a short video clip of one minute (three minutes before the 45th episode). The TV audience then determined the person to compete with Stefan Raab by televoting. One episode consisted of up to 15 games between Raab and the contestant plus one tiebreaker game if the scoreline was even after the fifteenth game. Each episode consecutively won by Raab added €500,000 to the jackpot, e.g. the prize money in an episode following three consecutive Raab victories summed up to €2,000,000. A losing contestant did not receive any prize money at all, regardless of the final scoreline.

The games included sports contests such as biathlon, go-karting, badminton and ice hockey, puzzles, quizzes and various other challenges, each episode featuring different games than the ones before, except for one quiz called Blamieren oder Kassieren, which appeared in almost every episode. The majority of games were played in the studio, a few games had to be carried out outside (like the aforementioned biathlon contest or riding a speed boat in the Cologne harbor). The first game awarded one point, the second game two points and up to fifteen points for the fifteenth game. The show ended once Raab or his opponent gained more than 60 of the possible 120 points. Therefore, the earliest point to win an episode was after completion of the eleventh game (1+2+3+4+5+6+7+8+9+10+11=66). Due to this extraordinary distribution of points it was possible to win an episode despite losing the majority of games, e.g. if one was successful the final five games (11+12+13+14+15=65) while the opponent was successful in the first ten games (1+2+3+4+5+6+7+8+9+10=55).

Six episodes of Schlag den Raab were broadcast each year, three in the first half of the year and another three in the second half of the year. The last episode aired on 19 December 2015. For this last episode, each of fifteen contestants faced Raab in one game. Each contestant who managed to defeat Raab received €100,000 from the €1.5 million prize fund and moved on to a final game. For the final game, all of the contestants who had beaten Raab played against each other for the remaining money. Six contestants beat Raab in their games, so that the winner of the final game received an additional €900,000.

Each episode also featured up to four music artists.

History 
As the show was broadcast live and the games were of different duration, a single episode generally had no fixed time limit. It regularly ran for four or more hours including commercials. The very first episode ended just after midnight at 00:01 after a runtime of three hours and 46 minutes and was therefore the shortest episode. The 49th and longest episode ended at 02:23, which equals a runtime of six hours and eight minutes.

Raab won 38 of the 54 episodes, not counting the final episode in which Raab faced multiple opponents. He was first defeated in the third episode, when contestant Matthias Göbel won €1.5 million. The highest amount won by a single contestant was €3.5 million (Bernd Stadelmann on 15 December 2012). On three occasions an episode ended after just eleven games – each time Raab being the winner. The fastest candidate to beat Raab was Deaon Maxwell (episode 27) after 12 games. Two candidates, one female and one male, were defeated without scoring a single point. Until 25 April 2015 no woman had defeated Raab.

All candidates except Jan May (episode 12) were younger than Raab on the date of the episode. On 1 November 2014, the episode had to be postponed for the first time in the history of the show, as Raab was suffering from a severe cold. That episode eventually aired a fortnight later, on 15 November 2014.

In June 2015, Raab announced his retirement from television, which ultimately led to the show's cancellation in the same year. The last episode aired on 19 December 2015.

Schlag den Raab was one of the most successful Saturday evening shows in Germany in the late 2000s and early 2010s with audiences of up to four million people.

Awards 
The show was nominated for the Adolf Grimme Awards category entertainment/special in 2007 and 2008. Schlag den Raab won the Deutscher Fernsehpreis for Best Entertainment Show in 2007, and won a Goldene Kamera in the category Entertainment in 2008.

Episodes

Related series
Three other series have been created with the same format as Schlag den Raab:

Schlag den Star
Schlag den Henssler
Schlag den Besten

International versions

Video games 
Several video game adaptations of the show have been released for the Wii, PlayStation 3 and Microsoft Windows platforms in Germany since 10 September 2010, as numerous versions of a board game and a quiz. Schlag den Star, a game for the Nintendo Switch, was developed by Lost the Game Studios and published by bitComposer Games in Germany. The first edition for the Wii was a success in the German market.

See also 
 Beat the Star
 Beat the Star (Australia)
 Vem kan slå Filip & Fredrik (2008)

References

External links 
 
 

ProSieben original programming
German game shows
2006 German television series debuts
2015 German television series endings
German-language television shows
Television series by Banijay